The 12th Continental Regiment was raised April 23, 1775, as a Massachusetts militia regiment at Cambridge, Massachusetts, under Colonel Moses Little. The regiment would join the Continental Army in June 1775. The regiment saw action during the Siege of Boston, the New York Campaign and the Battle of Trenton. The regiment was disbanded on January 1, 1777, at Morristown, New Jersey.

External links
Bibliography of the Continental Army in Massachusetts compiled by the United States Army Center of Military History

12th Continental Regiment